Nehemiah Hawkins (1833 – January 15, 1928) was an American inventor, publisher and author (pen name Theodore Audel) was born in Providence, Rhode Island. He started working with the G&C Merriam Company of Springfield, MA. In Chicago he established a magazine called Steam — soon sold and incorporated into Power   — then moved to New York. He was survived by a son and two daughters.

He wrote (or commissioned and published under his own name) many of the popular Audel's Guides popular with engineers and craftsmen and published by Theodore Audel & Company of New York. He sometimes used the pseudonym William Rogers  (a likely reference to Roger Williams).

The content of his books published prior to 1923 is now in the Public Domain.

Works in part or whole by N. Hawkins
(In order by year; years may not be first editions.)
 Handbook of Calculations for Engineers and Firemen. 1889.
 Maxims and instructions for the boiler room. T. Audel, 1891.
 Aids to Engineers' Examinations. 1894. 210pp.
 New catechism of electricity: a practical treatise. T. Audel & Co., 1896. 541pp. "This work is respectfully dedicated to Thomas A. Edison of Llewellyn Park, N.J."
 New catechism of the steam engine: with chapters on gas, oil and hot air engines. Theo. Audel, 1898 (copyright 1897; reprinted 1900, 1904.) 437pp.
 Hawkins Indicator Catechism.  A Practical Treatise for the Use of Erecting and Operating Engineers, Superintendents, Students of Steam Engineering, Etc. T. Audel, 1899.
 Aids to engineers' examinations: Prepared for applicants of all grades, with questions and answers. A summary of the principles and practice of steam engineering. T. Audel, 1901. 210pp.
 Self-Help Mechanical Drawing for home study. T. Audel, 1902. 287pp.
 The progressive machinist: a practical and educational treatise, with illustrations. T. Audel, 1903. 336pp. (Alternate title: 'The Advance Machinist'.)
 (as William Rogers). Pumps and hydraulics, Part 1. T. Audel, 1905. 419pp
 (as William Rogers). Pumps and hydraulics, Part 2. T. Audel, 1905. 424pp.
 Hawkins' mechanical dictionary: a cyclopedia of words, terms, phrases and data used in the mechanic arts, trades and sciences. T. Audel, 1909. 684pp.
 Hawkins' electrical dictionary: a cyclopedia of words, terms, phrases and data used in the electric arts, trades and sciences. Audel, 1910. 537pp.
 Hawkins Electrical Guide: Alternating currents and alternators. T. Audel, 1914. 1266pp.
 Hawkins and Staff, Hawkins Electrical Guide Number One. New York: Theo. Audel, 1917.
 Hawkins, Theodore Lucas, Frank Duncan Graham. Audels new marine engineers guide: a practical treatise on marine engines, boilers and auxiliary machinery..... Theo. Audel, 1918.
 Hawkins, Edwin P. Anderson. Audels mechanical dictionary for technical trades, arts and sciences: defining 17000 words, terms, phrases, formulas, rules. Theo. Audel, 1942. 948pp.

See also
 Hawkins Electrical Guide
 Frank D. Graham
 Edwin P. Anderson
 Ralph Newstead

References

External links
 
 

1833 births
1928 deaths
American book publishers (people)